Ian John McCafferty (born 24 November 1944) is a Scottish former long-distance runner. He won the silver medal at the 1970 Commonwealth Games 5000 metres when he recorded a time of 13:23.34.

This was one of the greatest races of all time. Reigning European 5000 metres champion Ian Stewart set a new European record and the two Scots, moved up to second and third on the world all-time list. In the race McCafferty defeated the current world record holder Ron Clarke, and Olympic 1,500 metres champion Kip Keino. McCafferty also finished sixth in the Commonwealth 1,500 metres in a time of 3:42.2.

McCafferty was Scottish 5000 metres champion in 1971, and was also three times the Scottish champion in the mile run. He also won the AAA Indoor Championships on three occasions for two miles/3000 metres. He won the Junior race at the 1964 International Cross Country Championships.

He represented Great Britain at the 1972 Munich Olympics. Competing over the 5000 m, he finished in 11th place with a time of 13:43.2 minutes. He was quicker in the heats, having won that race in a time of 13:38.2. McCafferty was so disappointed that he never raced again as an amateur. McCafferty was also the first Scot to break the four-minute mile.

McCafferty became the third fastest British miler of all time in 1969. At the end of 1972 he was fifth on the world all-time list for 5000 metres.

The U.S. magazine Track & Field News' annual world rankings ranked McCafferty fifth at 5000 metres in 1967. They ranked him third in 1970 and eighth in 1972.

Personal bests
Mile run – 3:56.8 min (1969)
3000 metres indoors – 7:56.2 min (1967)
5000 metres – 13:19.66 min (1972)

References

External links
Sporting-heroes.net profile

1944 births
Living people
Scottish male long-distance runners
Olympic athletes of Great Britain
Athletes (track and field) at the 1972 Summer Olympics
Commonwealth Games medallists in athletics
Athletes (track and field) at the 1966 British Empire and Commonwealth Games
Athletes (track and field) at the 1970 British Commonwealth Games
Commonwealth Games silver medallists for Scotland
Medallists at the 1970 British Commonwealth Games